Man Island may refer to:

 Man Island (Bahamas)
 Man Island (Andaman and Nicobar Islands)
 Mann Island, Liverpool, England

See also
 Isle of Man